The 2023 Kwara State gubernatorial election will take place on 18 March 2023, to elect the Governor of Kwara State, concurrent with elections to the Kwara State House of Assembly as well as twenty-seven other gubernatorial elections and elections to all other state houses of assembly. The election—which was postponed from its original 11 March date—will be held three weeks after the presidential election and National Assembly elections. Incumbent APC Governor AbdulRahman AbdulRazaq has been renominated by his party.

The primaries, scheduled for between 4 April and 9 June 2022, resulted in AbdulRazaq being renominated by the All Progressives Congress unopposed on 26 May while the Peoples Democratic Party nominated Shuaib Yaman Abdullahi on 25 May. For the Social Democratic Party, its first primary on 25 May was annulled leading to a rerun on 30 May; both primaries were won by Hakeem Lawal.

Electoral system
The governor of Kwara State is elected using a modified two-round system. To be elected in the first round, a candidate must receive the plurality of the vote and over 25% of the vote in at least two-thirds of state local government areas. If no candidate passes this threshold, a second round will be held between the top candidate and the next candidate to have received a plurality of votes in the highest number of local government areas.

Background
Kwara State is a large state in the North Central with a growing economy and vast natural areas but facing agricultural underdevelopment, deforestation, and insecurity. The state's 2019 elections had a large swing towards the state APC. Although the APC had won most 2015 elections in Kwara, the vast majority of APC officeholders left the party in 2018 to follow Senator Bukola Saraki into the PDP; despite the Saraki dynasty's longstanding control over Kwaran politics, the APC-led Ó Tó Gẹ́ movement swept the state in 2019. The APC won all three senate seats back and in the process, defeated Saraki by a wide margin. Similarly, the APC gained five PDP-held House seats to sweep all House of Representatives elections. On the state level, the APC gained the governorship and all but one seat in the House of Assembly. These results, coupled with presidential incumbent Muhammadu Buhari (APC) winning the state with nearly 70%, led to the categorization of the 2019 elections as a seismic shift in the state's politics.

During AbdulRazaq's 2019 campaign, he based pledges on improving government transparency, rehabilitating transportation, and gender inclusivity among others. In terms of his performance, AbdulRazaq was praised for education policy, healthcare investment, appointing Nigeria's first majority-women state cabinet, and social investment programmes. On the other hand, he was criticized for mishandling the demolition of a Saraki family property, alleged ethnic and regional prejudice when making a KWASU appointment, illegally dismissing elected local government chairmen and failing to conduct constitutionally-mandated local government elections, and raising the state debt.

Primary elections
The primaries, along with any potential challenges to primary results, were to take place between 4 April and 3 June 2022 but the deadline was extended to 9 June. According to some candidates and community leaders from the Northern district, an informal zoning gentlemen's agreement sets the Kwara North Senatorial District to have the next governor as since the 1999 return of democracy, all Kwara governors have come from either the Kwara Central or Kwara South Senatorial Districts. In accordance with these calls, the PDP zoned its nomination to the North but the APC did not close its primary to non-Northerners and renominated AbdulRazaq, who is from Ilorin West in Kwara Central; the SDP nominated Hakeem Lawal from Ilorin East in the central district as well.

All Progressives Congress 
The year prior to the APC primaries were beset by party infighting between two different party factions, one backed by ministers Lai Mohammed and Gbemisola Ruqayyah Saraki while the other was supported by incumbent Governor AbdulRahman AbdulRazaq. The two factions held two separate parallel party congresses in late 2021 but as AbdulRazaq is a serving governor, his faction's congress was recognized as legitimate by the national party. In the wake of the decision, a large number of Mohammed-Saraki faction supporters left the APC (mainly joining the Social Democratic Party). Although neither Mohammed nor Saraki defected, analysts state that the defections have the potential to hurt the APC in the general election. Another point of contention were the calls from Kwara North groups for the governorship to be zoned to their region; to combat those demands, prominent northern APC members like House of Assembly Speaker Yakubu Danladi-Salihu and Senator Suleiman Sadiq Umar held events to back AbdulRazaq's re-election bid.

On the primary date, AbdulRazaq was the sole candidate and won the nomination unanimously. In his acceptance speech, AbdulRazaq thanked delegates and the state at-large while pledging to continue the work of his administration.

Nominated 
 AbdulRahman AbdulRazaq: Governor (2019–present)
 Running mate—Kayode Alabi: Deputy Governor (2019–present)

Declined 
 Yakubu Danladi-Salihu: House of Assembly member for Ilesha/Gwanara (2019–present) and Speaker of the House of Assembly (2019–present)

Results

People's Democratic Party 
In December 2021, Kwara PDP Publicity Secretary Tunde Asholu announced that the party had zoned their gubernatorial nomination to Kwara North Senatorial District. A few months later, former Senate President Bukola Saraki (the de facto leader of the Kwara PDP) announced that the party nomination would be further micro-zoned to Edu, Moro, and Pategi LGAs; Saraki also announced that the candidates had agreed to use the consensus method for the gubernatorial primary. The former was controversial as the only Governor to ever come from the Northern district, Mohammed Shaaba Lafiagi, is from Edu and thus micro-zoning to the same area instead of Baruten and Kaiama LGAs was unpopular in those LGAs leading to extensive internal PDP strife; the controversy was compounded by an ethnic element as the Edu-Moro-Pategi area is majority-Nupe while Baruten and Kaiama are majority Baatonu and Bokobaru, respectively. On the other hand, the consensus method was reaffirmed unanimously by the candidates on 13 April 2022 after a meeting with Saraki at his Abuja home.

On the primary date, the three candidates contested an indirect primary that ended with Shuaib Yaman Abdullahi emerging as the party nominee after results showed him winning just over 90% of the delegates' votes. In his acceptance speech, Abdullahi vowed to win the general election and asked the party to unite around him. On 17 June, Gbenga Peter Makanjuola—former House of Representatives member for Ekiti/Isin/Irepodun/Oke-ero—was selected as the deputy gubernatorial nominee.

Nominated 
 Shuaib Yaman Abdullahi: 2019 APC gubernatorial candidate
 Running mate—Gbenga Peter Makanjuola: former House of Representatives member for Ekiti/Isin/Irepodun/Oke-ero

Eliminated in primary 
 Aliyu Ahman-Pategi: former House of Representatives member for Edu/Moro/Pategi
 Mohammed Gana Yisa: former Ambassador to Japan and professor

Withdrew 
 M.M. Abubakar: businessman
 Ndanusa Kawu Adam
 Abubakar S. Ahmad
 Ibrahim Bio: former Minister of Transportation (2008–2010), former House of Assembly member, and former Speaker of the House of Assembly
 Mohammed Ajia Ibrahim: 2019 PDP gubernatorial candidate and former police officer (to run for MHR for Ilorin West/Asa)
 Baba Idris
 Abubakar M. Shamaki

Declined 
 Bolaji Abdullahi: 2019 PDP gubernatorial candidate; former Minister of Sports (2012–2014); former Minister of Youth Development (2011–2012); and former Commissioner of Education, Science and Technology (2007–2011)
 Ali Ahmad: former House of Assembly member for Ilorin South (2015–2019), former Speaker of the House of Assembly (2015–2019), 2019 PDP gubernatorial candidate, and former House of Representatives member for Ilorin East/Ilorin South (2011–2015)
 Aisha Ahman-Pategi: former Commissioner for Special Duties (2019–2020) and former Commissioner for Local Government and Chieftaincy Affairs (2020)
 Abdullah Alikinla: former commissioner
 Razaq Atunwa: former House of Representatives member for Asa/Ilorin West (2015–2019), 2019 PDP gubernatorial nominee, former House of Assembly member for Owode/Onire (2011–2015), former Speaker of the Kwara State House of Assembly (2011–2015), and former commissioner (2005–2011)
 Ladi Hassan: 2019 PDP gubernatorial candidate, former Executive Secretary of the Federal Capital Development Authority, and former Commissioner for Health
 Saka Isau: 2019 PDP gubernatorial candidate, former state Attorney-General and Commissioner for Justice, and former Secretary to the State Government
 Abdulwahab Issa: former House of Representatives member for Ilorin East/Ilorin South (2007–2011), former Ilorin South Local Government Chairman (2004–2007), and former Ilorin East Local Government Chairman (1996–1997)

Results

Social Democratic Party 
In early 2022, large groups of APC members defected to the SDP after the APC internal party crisis. After welcoming the new members, Kwara SDP leadership expressed confidence over the party's prospects in the general election; however as the primary neared, zoning became an internal issue as Kwara North groups demanded the nomination be zoned to the North. Further strife between longtime party members and new APC defectors descended into a full-blown party crisis as two separate state congresses were held in April 2022.

The national SDP set its gubernatorial expression of interest form price at ₦1 million and its nomination form price at ₦15 million with a 50% discount for youth and free forms for women and candidates with disabilities while scheduling the primary for 25 May.

On the initial primary date, one major candidate (House member Abdulganiyu Saka Cook Olododo) withdrew while the other six candidates continued to an indirect primary in Ilorin ending in Hakeem Lawal winning after announced results showed Lawal winning 54% of the delegates' votes. However, runner-up Shuaib Oba Abdulraheem challenged the results to the national party which agreed to hold a rerun primary on 30 May. The rerun was also won by Lawal, with his 77% of the vote winning the nomination a second time. Abdulraheem continued to protest before leaving the party to obtain the NNPP nomination. In mid-July, Joshua Olayinka Olakunle—a pastor from Ora, Ifelodun LGA—was announced as Lawal's running mate.

Nominated 
 Hakeem Lawal: 2019 APC gubernatorial candidate and son of former Governor Mohammed Alabi Lawal
 Running mate—Joshua Olayinka Olakunle: pastor and former lecturer

Eliminated in primary 
 Shuaib Oba Abdulraheem: former Vice Chancellor of the University of Ilorin (defected after the primary to successfully run in the NNPP gubernatorial primary)
 Tajudeen Abdulkadir Audu: 2019 APC gubernatorial candidate
 Sunday Babalola: engineer
 Kale Belgore: former aide to Governor AbdulRahman AbdulRazaq and brother of politician Dele Belgore
 Khaleel Bolaji: former commissioner

Withdrew 
 Abdulganiyu Saka Cook Olododo: House of Representatives member for Ilorin East/Ilorin South (to run for re-election as MHR for Ilorin East/Ilorin South)

Results

Minor parties 

 Dauda Salman Magaji (Action Alliance)
Running mate: Bandipo Victoria Yemisi
 Shina Hammed Oniye (Action Democratic Party)
Running mate: Hamza Nma Ndawuya
 Bamidele Olaitan Omotosho (Action Peoples Party)
Running mate: Abdullahi Ibrahim
 Ahmed Aliyu (African Action Congress)
Running mate: Bamidele Joseph Oyinloye
 Joel Ayo (African Democratic Congress)
Running mate: Julius Olayide Olawuyi
 Motunrayo Deborah Jaiyeola (Allied Peoples Movement)
Running mate: Oyedeji Adetunji Oyekunle
 Abdullahi Ibrahim (Labour Party)
Running mate: Basambo Kabir Abubakar
 Kehinde Adeyemi Popoola (National Rescue Movement)
Running mate: TBD
 Shuaib Oba Abdulraheem (New Nigeria Peoples Party)
Running mate: Joshua Adebisi Fadiji
 Abdulkareem Abiodun Mustapha (People's Redemption Party)
Running mate: Shittu Olaitan Shuaib
 Waziri Yakubu Gobir (Young Progressives Party)
Running mate: Olafade Folusho George-Bolujoko
 Danjuma Zakari Usman (Zenith Labour Party)
Running mate: Rasheedat Tunrayo Ayoku

Campaign
In the wake of the primaries, pundits reiterated the competitiveness of the general election while noting the continued defections from the APC to the SDP and the calls for zoning to the northern district, which only the PDP heeded. Defections from the APC were seen as especially damaging for AbdulRazaq in the months after the 2022 Osun State gubernatorial election—divides in the Osun APC aided in the unseating of the APC incumbent as his internal opponents helped other parties; however, it was also noted that the two main aggrieved APC members—Minister of Information and Culture Lai Mohammed and Minister of State for Mines and Steel Development Gbemisola Ruqayyah Saraki—appeared to have split with Mohammed supporters backing the Lawal while Saraki appears to have reconciled with her brother as her supporters backed the PDP.

In July and August, the AbdulRazaq and Abdullahi campaigns were noted as being among several election campaigns that used the catastrophic Alanamu Market fire to hawk for votes. The post-market fire campaign spots were seen of further proof that the Central District would be the battleground area for the election; later reporting in September focused on the fact that all major candidates other than Abdullahi are from the Central District. In turn, Abdullahi's native North District was considered safe for him while the South District was categorized as a battle between AbdulRazaq and Abdullahi.

By October, AbdulRazaq began conducting town halls throughout the state alongside other elected officials. The PDP loudly protested the events, claiming that framing campaign events as "town hall meetings" by the governor was disingenuous while the use of public funds for the events was wasteful. Later that month, pundits reiterated the potentially ruinous impact divides within the APC could have on AbdulRazaq's campaign. The next month, on 7 November, the first public poll—conducted by NIO Polls and commissioned by the Anap Foundation—was released for the race with it showing a substantial lead for AbdulRazaq while Abdullahi	and Lawal trailed in second and third, respectively. Conversely, Adebola Bakare—the national secretary of the Nigerian Political Science Association—opined that the election was a tossup in late December 2022 with claims that Abdullahi was still winning his native northern region but now Lawal had gained in the southern region while AbdulRazaq was leading in the central region.

By 2023, attention largely switched to the presidential election on 25 February. In the election, Kwara State voted for Bola Tinubu (APC); Tinubu won 56.1% of the vote to defeat Atiku Abubakar (PDP) at 29.1% and Peter Obi (LP) at 6.6%. Although the result was unsurprising as Kwara is in Tinubu's southwestern base and projections had favored him, the totals led to increased focus on AbdulRazaq campaign due to Tinubu's wide margin of victory. Gubernatorial campaign analysis in the wake of the presidential election noted unique regional and religious dynamics while reiterating the potential impact of the continued APC divides. Despite the APC crisis, the EiE-SBM forecast projected AbdulRazaq to win based on "APC’s sweep of the federal elections."

Polling

Projections

Conduct

Electoral timetable

General election

Results

By senatorial district 
The results of the election by senatorial district.

By federal constituency
The results of the election by federal constituency.

By local government area 
The results of the election by local government area.

See also 
 2023 Nigerian elections
 2023 Nigerian gubernatorial elections

Notes

References 

Kwara State gubernatorial election
2023
2023 Kwara State elections
Kwara